Seated Nude is a 1917 painting by Amedeo Modigliani, now in the Royal Museum of Fine Arts, Antwerp.

References

Paintings in the collection of the Royal Museum of Fine Arts Antwerp
1917 paintings
Paintings by Amedeo Modigliani
Nude art